Methanobrevibacter woesei is a species of methanogen archaeon, named after Carl R. Woese.

Description
Coccobacillus with slightly tapered ends, about 0.6 micrometres in width and 1 micrometre in length, occurring in pairs or short chains. Gram-positive reaction. Its cell walls are composed of pseudomurein. It is a strict anaerobe and its type strain is GST(=DSM 11979T =OCM 815T). It was first isolated from goose faeces.

References

Further reading

External links
LPSN

Type strain of Methanobrevibacter woesei at BacDive -  the Bacterial Diversity Metadatabase

Euryarchaeota
Archaea described in 2002